Louis Guy LeBlanc (23 January 1921 – 10 November 1990) was a Liberal party member of the House of Commons of Canada. He was born in Saint-Gabriel, Quebec and became a consulting forestry engineer, land surveyor and life insurance agent by career.

He was first elected at the Rimouski riding in
the 1965 general election, then re-elected there in the 1968 election. After completing his term in the 28th Canadian Parliament, LeBlanc was defeated at Rimouski in the 1972 federal election.

External links
 

1921 births
1990 deaths
People from Lanaudière
Members of the House of Commons of Canada from Quebec
Liberal Party of Canada MPs
French Quebecers